Alexander McKim (January 10, 1748January 18, 1832) was a U.S. Representative from Maryland.

Biography
Born in Brandywine in the Delaware Colony, McKim pursued an academic course.  He later moved to Baltimore, Maryland, and served as a member of the Maryland House of Delegates in 1778.  He served in the Revolutionary War as a member of the Baltimore Independent Cadets and of the First Baltimore Cavalry.  He also fought under Lafayette in the Virginia campaign of 1781.  After the war, he served as member of the Maryland Senate from 1806 to 1810.

McKim was elected as a Democratic-Republican to the Eleventh, Twelfth, and Thirteenth Congresses, where he served from March 4, 1809, to March 3, 1815.  After Congress, he engaged in mercantile pursuits.  He also served as justice of court of quarter sessions, and was presiding judge of the Baltimore County Orphans' Court at the time of his death in Baltimore.  He is interred in Greenmount Cemetery.

References
 Retrieved on February 28, 2010

1748 births
1832 deaths
Members of the Maryland House of Delegates
Maryland state senators
Maryland state court judges
Maryland militiamen in the American Revolution
Burials at Green Mount Cemetery
People from New Castle County, Delaware
Democratic-Republican Party members of the United States House of Representatives from Maryland